2010 in Andorra:

Events

2010
 2010: Scheduled date for every home in Andorra to be linked to the Internet by fibre optic connexion.

2011

2012

2013

2014

2015
See 2015 in Andorra

References

 
Andorra